The Sardar Jangal Stadium is a sports stadium located in Rasht, Iran. It is used by Sepidrood Rasht S.C. in some Iran's Premier Football League matches as of the start of the 2017–18 season.

References

Football venues in Iran
Buildings and structures in Gilan Province
Sport in Gilan Province